The Skeptic Encyclopedia of Pseudoscience is a two-volume collection of articles that discuss the Skeptics Society's scientific findings of investigations into pseudoscientific and supernatural claims.  The editor, Michael Shermer, director of the Skeptics Society, has compiled articles originally published in Skeptic magazine with some conceptual overviews and historical documents to create this encyclopedia. It was published by ABC-CLIO in 2002.

About the editor

Michael Shermer is an American science writer and science historian. He gained Bachelor’s and Master’s degrees in psychology before completing a PhD in the history of science. The author of more than 18 books on skepticism and science, Shermer is the founder of The Skeptics Society—which began in Los Angeles but now has an international membership—and the editor of its magazine Skeptic. Between April 2001 to January 2019, he was a monthly contributor to Scientific American magazine with a column called Skeptic.
Shermer regularly engages in debates on a variety of topics, in which he emphasises the application of scientific skepticism to combat pseudoscience.  Shermer was the producer and co-host of the 13-hour Fox Family television series Exploring the Unknown which was broadcast in 1999. He is also a scientific advisor to the American Council on Science and Health (ACSH).

About the contributors

Each of the contributing authors is listed alphabetically followed by a paragraph listing which sections of the encyclopedia they have contributed to and their academic expertise and field of interest, as it relates to pseudoscience. Some, like author Massimo Pigliucci and magician and author James Randi will be well known, whilst others like Eric Wojciehowski are less well known.

Overview

This two-volume work provides a broad introduction to the most prominent pseudoscientific claims made in the name of science. Covering the popular, the academic, and the bizarre, the encyclopedia includes topics from alien abductions to the Bermuda Triangle, crop circles, Feng Shui, and near-death experiences.

It is organised into five sections:

The first is titled ‘Important pseudoscientific concepts’, which is an alphabetically arranged section of 59 subject analyses conducted by scientists and researchers, exploring alternative medicine, astrology, handwriting analysis, hypnosis, reincarnation, séances, spiritualism, UFOs, witchcraft, etc.

The second section is ‘Investigations from the Skeptic magazine’ which as it suggests are deeper analyses of selected subjects, based on 23 investigations from the magazine. More in-depth than the previous section, it includes what Shermer refers to as “…several critical pieces on the pseudoscience often found in psychology and psychotherapy”.

Part three contains case studies: thirteen in-depth analyses of specific studies originally conducted for Skeptic magazine and used as part of the larger phenomena under investigation. For example, three articles are devoted to recovered memory therapy and false memory syndrome. One is from a psychiatrist’s perspective, one from a patient’s perspective, and one from a father’s perspective. The topics of the case studies range from police ‘psychics’ to the ‘medical intuitive’ Carolyn Myss. The aim is to give the reader a complete analysis of a subject. Indeed, in the introduction to the book Shermer says that he expects that this section could be used by students, journalists and science professionals as resource for conducting background research.

In part four, there are 12 articles originally published in Skeptic described as a “debate between experts”, on such topics as ‘memes’ and ‘evolutionary psychology’. Shermer claims that this is “…the most original section ever compiled in an encyclopedia in the form of a “pro and con” debate between experts, allowing readers to judge for themselves by hearing both sides of an issue.”

Part five is titled ‘Historical documents’ and includes five classic works in the history of science and pseudoscience, such as the speech that William Jennings Bryan never delivered in the Scopes trial, and the first scientific and skeptical investigation of a paranormal/spiritual phenomenon (mesmerism) by Benjamin Franklin and Antoine Lavoisier.

Quotes from the book

“If there is an underlying theme in this encyclopedia… it is that science is an exquisite blend of data and theory, facts and hypotheses, observations and views. If we conceive of science as a fluid and dynamic way of thinking instead of a staid and dogmatic body of knowledge, it is clear that the data/theory stratum runs throughout the archaeology of human knowledge and is an inexorable part of the scientific process. We can no more expunge from ourselves all biases and preferences than we can find a truly objective Archimedean point—a god’s-eye view—of the human condition. We are, after all, humans, not gods.”

“What we hope to provide in this encyclopedia is a thorough, objective, and balanced analysis of the most prominent scientific and pseudoscientific controversies made in the name of science, mixing both facts and theory.”

“The encyclopedia entries are written at a level appropriate for high school and college students conducting research in science and pseudoscience, members of the media looking for a balanced treatment of a subject, and those in the general public who desire a highly readable yet trustworthy resource…”

“…members of the media desperately need a reference resource in order to quickly get their minds around a subject, to book guests on both sides of an issue in order to properly set up a debate, and to get “just the facts” needed for the sound-bite story that is often demanded in the hectic world of journalism.”

“…most entries offer a respectable bibliography of the best sources on that subject from both the skeptics’ and the believers’ perspectives, allowing readers to conduct additional research on their own after learning what the encyclopedia’s expert author has had to say on the subject.”

Reception

Tom Gilson in Against the Grain  has some positive comments about the encyclopedia:
"[T]he treatment afforded the topics covered in this encyclopedia is serious ... The Skeptic Encyclopedia of Pseudoscience is one of those sets in which the fascination value may equal its reference use ... without a doubt, many people are captivated with the issues discussed in this work."  However, he also is of the opinion that the final section is too brief and should be either extended or removed. Gilson questions the price of the volumes, given that “…at least half of the content is reprinted from Skeptic Magazine.” He does however recognise that “The contributors are fully identified and many are academics with advanced degrees.”

The American Reference Books Annual says that: "A careful reading ... should be required of all who wish to get a university degree ... In the Internet age ... people ... should make every effort toward two goals: To spread good scientific methods for evaluating truth claims, and to help nurture enlightened traditional worldviews. ...  This set does much in the direction of achieving the first goal."

See also
 Scientific skepticism
 Skeptic's Dictionary
 An Encyclopedia of Claims, Frauds, and Hoaxes of the Occult and Supernatural

References

External links
 The Skeptic Encyclopedia of Pseudoscience
 ABC-CLIO listing: The Skeptic Encyclopedia of Pseudoscience'

2002 non-fiction books
21st-century encyclopedias
Encyclopedias of science
English-language books
Scientific skepticism mass media